Karl Plattner (February 13, 1919 in Mals, Italy – December 8, 1986 in Milan, Italy) was a Southtyrolian Painter.

Biography 
Plattner was born in 1919 as one of ten children in the Obervinschgau. After he left school, he apprenticed as a painter, first in Mals  and later in Brixen.

There, he became acquainted with Sebastian Fasal, Professor of the Academy of Fine Arts Vienna, where he studied mural painting.

During Second World War he was a soldier in the German Wehrmacht and was put into an American prisoner-of-war camp by Livorno. After his captivity he continue his studies in Florence, Milan and Paris. At this time, he received the first public contracts in South Tyrol for fresco paintings.

In 1952 he and his wife moved to Brasil and exhibited his works in Rio de Janeiro and São Paulo. He also received important contracts in Brazil.

In 1956 he became acquainted with Clemens Holzmeister. With him he realized the artistic representation of the box vestibule in the new Great Festival Hall of Salzburg.

In 1961 he moved to Tourrettes-sur-Loup and Cipières in Southern France. From 1963 to 1978 he lived in Milan.

Works 
 1951 - Pietà
 1954 - Big mural in the conference hall of the South Tyrolean Landtag in Bolzano
 1965 - Nächtliches Zwiegespräch
 1967 - Vietnam
 1971 - Fra due finestre

External links 
 Silvia Höller: Karl Plattner (1919-1986) (German)
 Kunst im Südtiroler Landtag (German)

20th-century Italian painters
Italian male painters
1919 births
1986 deaths
Academy of Fine Arts Vienna alumni
People from Mals
Germanophone Italian people
20th-century Italian male artists